Priscilla Renea Hamilton (born September 14, 1988), known professionally as Muni Long (pronounced "money long"), is an American singer and songwriter. In 2023, she won the Grammy award for Best R&B Performance for her single “Hrs & Hrs.” Under her birth name, her solo debut studio album, Jukebox, was released through Capitol Records in 2009. She then spent the following decade co-writing songs for other recording artists, including the singles "California King Bed" by Rihanna, "Worth It" by Fifth Harmony, "Love So Soft" by Kelly Clarkson, "Imagine" by Ariana Grande, and the global chart-topper "Timber" by Pitbull featuring Kesha.

Returning to her career as a solo artist, her second studio album, Coloured (2018), was released via Thirty Tigers and Sony Music, and saw Hamilton exploring Americana and country soul genres. After adopting the stage name Muni Long, she experienced major commercial success as an independent artist with the single "Hrs and Hrs", which reached the top 20 on the Billboard Hot 100; ultimately leading her to sign a record deal with Def Jam Recordings. 

In 2023, she won the Grammy Award for Best R&B Performance for "Hrs and Hrs". She has received three other Grammy Award nominations throughout her career, including for Best New Artist, Best R&B Song ("Hrs & Hrs"), and a nomination for Album of the Year through her work on Back of My Mind (2021) by H.E.R.

Early life
Priscilla Renea Hamilton was born in 1988 on her grandparents' farm in Indian River County's rural Gifford neighborhood west of Vero Beach, Florida, and graduated from Vero Beach High School in 2006. Her father was a member of the Navy. She has stated she began singing at age two but was not comfortable with singing around people until she was older. She later stumbled upon YouTube and began posting videos of her singing in her room. Her first video was a rendition of "Cry Me a River" she submitted to a contest whose winner would sing with Justin Timberlake at the Grammy Awards, albeit she did not win. She recorded videos of herself singing the dictionary, and made her own songs independently. Her channel eventually received over 30,000 subscriptions and she was given the opportunity to participate in MTV's Say What? Karaoke.

Career

2009–2010: Career beginnings and Jukebox 

In 2009, after garnering popularity on YouTube, at age 21, Long signed with Capitol Records under her birth name. Her debut album was due for an October 20, 2009, release but was delayed for additional recording to occur. The album was preceded by the single "Dollhouse", which was released on August 18, 2009. The single failed to reach the Billboard Hot 100 but did reach number eleven on the Heatseekers singles chart, No. 31 on the Hot Dance Club Songs becoming a mild chart success.

Jukebox, was released on December 1, 2009. The record sold a mere 1,200 copies in its first week and failed to reach the Billboard 200. However, it did reach number twenty-three on the Billboard Heatseekers album chart, staying on the chart for one week. Despite its commercial failure, the album was critically acclaimed. Billboard highlighted her "knack for combining prose and poetry with catchy beats". The second and final single, "Lovesick", was released on March 2, 2010, but failed to chart completely.

2010–2018: Songwriting for other artists and Coloured
Long began writing songs for other recording artist. In 2010, she co-wrote the UK number-one single "Promise This"; as well as "California King Bed", a track from Rihanna's fifth studio album, Loud, released in November 2010. During late 2011, she took part in the ASCAP retreat, a songwriting event in France sponsored by Cain Foundation, Avid, Gibson and Sennheiser. She continued her songwriting career, landing credits on 2011 and 2012 albums by Rihanna, Demi Lovato, Madonna, Mika, Selena Gomez & The Scene, Chris Brown and Little Mix.

In 2013, Long was featured on B.o.B's song "John Doe" from his album Underground Luxury. In 2014 she also contributed to Fifth Harmony's debut album Reflection, by co-writing the song "Worth It", being the album's third single; the song reached number 12 on the Billboard Hot 100. Long co-wrote Carrie Underwood and Miranda Lambert's 2014 hit duet, "Somethin' Bad", which was nominated for a Grammy Award, and reached number one on Billboards Country Chart. The song was later chosen by NBC Sports to replace "I Hate Myself for Loving You" by Joan Jett as the opening theme for its National Football League. Like Jett's song, "Somethin' Bad" was reworked to fit the broadcast's narrative as "Oh, Sunday Night" and was performed by Carrie Underwood, who recorded the original with Miranda Lambert.

Long appeared as the vocalist on the 2015 single "Be Right There" by Diplo and Sleepy Tom. The track was given 'the hottest record in the world' title on the Annie Mac BBC Radio 1 Friday night show. The lyrics in "Be Right There" were taken from the 1992 single "Don't Walk Away" by Jade. In 2016, Long collaborated with Pusha T and Meek Mill on "Black Moses". The song served as part of The Birth of a Nation soundtrack album.

In 2017, Long featured on Train's song "Loverman", from their album A Girl, a Bottle, a Boat. On April 6, 2018, Long released "Gentle Hands" and "Heavenly", the first two singles from her then-forthcoming album, Coloured. Music videos for both singles premiered online via Paper Magazine. The album was released on June 22, 2018, marking nine years since her debut. NPR noted that as an African-American country album, Coloured is a "consciously confrontational statement". Rolling Stone showcased "Family Tree" within the album as a song of "empowerment". The song "Land of the Free", according to NPR, serves as "an appeal for empathy toward those who live in fear of racial profiling and police brutality". Ashley Gorley co-wrote several tracks.

2019–present: Breakthrough and Public Displays of Affection
Renea, working under the pseudonym "Muni Long" (pronounced "money long") as of 2019, released the song "Midnight Snack" with an accompanying video, featuring Jacob Latimore in October 2020. That same year, she was also credited for co-writing Ariana Grande's "Just like Magic" and "Six Thirty" off the album Positions. Explaining that Muni Long is the "protector of Priscilla", Long released her single titled "Build a Bae" featuring rapper Yung Bleu in December 2020, her fourth single release since October. She previously released her debut extended play (EP) Black Like This, which celebrates Blackness , on November 13 under her co-founded label imprint, Supergiant Records. This was followed by a seven-track EP Nobody Knows in July 2021. In November 2021, she released an eight-track EP titled Public Displays of Affection. Regarding the title, Long explained: "I really went in the studio writing the music and it was times I caught myself crying. I'm not the most touchy-feely person. So, for me, putting all my feelings on this project is sort of like my 'public display of affection'. Describing the EP as "intimate", Vibe ranked it as the 19th best R&B album of 2021. Long also released a music video for the EP track "Hrs and Hrs", a song on which she "details what she can do for hours upon hours with her partner". In January 2022, the track "Time Machine" started going viral on TikTok. 

In March 2022, Long signed with the record label Def Jam Recordings. According to Vogue, Muni Long reflects Renea's "new strong, fabulous persona through fashion" as well as music, creating a new "fashion identity" with the help of celebrity stylist Jason Rembert. Discussing the notion of being a Black role model, she stated: "how you're introduced to someone is the way they will remember you, unless you are reintroduced", following up with: "I'm in the reintroduction process."

On July 1, 2022 Long released the EP Public Displays of Affection Too, which was promoted by the singles "Pain", "Another", and "Baby Boo", the latter of which being a collaboration with rapper Saweetie. 

On September 14, 2022, Long announced that her third studio album (and debut under her current moniker) Public Displays of Affection: The Album would be released on September 23, 2022. The eighteen-track collection will feature every song from her prior two EPs (aside from "Just Beginning"), as well as six new tracks.

Personal life
Long has lived in Atlanta and subsequently Los Angeles since leaving Florida. She has been diagnosed with lupus. She has cited litigation, battles with former management, plus the "whirlwind of being dropped, re-signed then dropped again from a label" as creative catalysts for her work. She runs her own music label, Supergiant Records, named in reference to "the biggest star in the galaxy"  

Her song "Family Tree" was inspired by the time she was "kicked out of her family's home as a teenager".

She attended Vero Beach High School, the same high school as Jake Owen.

Discography

Studio albums

EPs

Singles

As lead artist

As featured artist

Writing credits
All writing credits adapted from Spotify unless otherwise noted.

Awards and nominations

Filmography

Notes

References

External links
 Official website
 

1988 births
Living people
African-American women singer-songwriters
People from Vero Beach, Florida
Singer-songwriters from Florida
Vero Beach High School alumni
21st-century African-American women singers
Activists from Florida
American anti-racism activists
American contemporary R&B singers
Capitol Records artists
Virgin Records artists
Def Jam Recordings artists
Thirty Tigers artists
Grammy Award winners